Anselmi: The Young Werewolf is a 2014 Finnish werewolf-themed fantasy film written and directed by Matti Pekkanen. The film's story is set in 1980s South Ostrobothnia, where a 15-year-old boy named Anselmi, who lives in a small village with his father Manu, struggles with the challenges of puberty and tries to find out the fate of his missing mother. Aleksi Holkko stars in the film's title role. Other actors include the Finnish singer Pauli Hanhiniemi and the American actor Ron Jeremy.

The soundtrack of the film includes the song "Hysteria" performed by Free Spirit.

Premise
Anselmi (Aleksi Holkko), a high school student who is awakening to his sexuality, lives on a farm with his father Manu (Sami Palolampi); Anselmi's mother Eeva (Liisa Ruuskanen) has disappeared 15 years earlier on the night of her son's baptism. Anselmi experiences frequent nightmares and uncontrollable changes in his body. Secrets begin to be revealed when Manu and the local vicar (Pauli Hanhiniemi) reveal the truth about the mother's fate and his true origin.

Cast
 Aleksi Holkko as Anselmi  
 Sami Palolampi as Manu  
 Liisa Ruuskanen as Eeva  
 Reetta Kankare as Milla  
 Pauli Hanhiniemi as vicar 
 Sami Alho as youth pastor Sampsa  
 Timo Saari as inseminator
 Topi Kohonen as shepherd
 Ron Jeremy as Roni

Production
The film's script, written by Matti Pekkanen, is based on the original idea by Sami Palolampi, which had been born in his mind already in the 90s. The film's script has been edited several times since then. The film is associated with the old script versions only by its name.

The Tampere-based production company Bottomland Productions Oy, founded by Pekkanen and Mikko Soukkala, was responsible for the production of the film. The production of the film started already in 2009, when Pekkanen and Soukkala directed a short film of the same name that was just over three minutes long, before it was decided to make the full-length film. The feature film was shot in Ähtäri, Alavus, Kangasala, Lempäälä, Virrat and Tampere, among other places.

Release
Anselmi: The Young Werewolf was premiered on January 24, 2014.

The film was nominated in 13 categories for the Kalevi Award in 2015. It won the award in nine categories: Best Film, Direction, Actor, Actor, Cinematography, Sound Design, Editing, Music and Special Effects.

Reception
The film's reception has been mostly modest and negative. In the review of Taneli Topelius from Ilta-Sanomat, "the name of the film, which was created by hobbyists, promises a little too much" and that "the shots that look good barely help to swallow the story as well, even if its sloppiness takes too far away from the main point." Veli-Pekka Lehtonen from Helsingin Sanomat only gave the film one star, saying that "the film will remain in Finnish film history mainly as a work with the American porn actor Ron Jeremy in a cameo role." Henri Walter Rehnström from Turun Sanomat thinks that "the movie conveys more the passion of the creators than the actual skill of making." Klas Fransberg from Vasabladet considered the film's "crammed script to be its stumbling block".

References

External links

2014 fantasy films
Werewolf films
2010s Finnish-language films
Finnish fantasy films
Finnish drama films
Films set in Finland
Films set in the 1980s